Sulk is a 1982 album by the Associates.

Sulk may also refer to:

Music
Sulk (British band), a London psychedelic rock/shoegaze band
Sulk (Canadian band), a Canadian pop/rock/dance music group

Albums
Sulk, 1996 album by Sulk
Sulk, 1993 album  by Molly Half Head

Songs
"Sulk" (song), by Radiohead from The Bends
"Sulk", by Billy Bragg from Reaching to the Converted

Other uses 
 Sulk (horse), a racehorse

See also
Sulky, a 2-wheeled horse- or dog-drawn cart
Le Sulk, nickname for French footballer Nicolas Anelka